Dervishiya is a genus of moths in the family Cossidae.

Species
Dervishiya cadambae (Moore, 1865)
Dervishiya vartianae Yakovlev, 2011

References

 , 2006, New Cossidae (Lepidoptera) from Asia, Africa and Macronesia, Tinea 19 (3): 188-213.

External links
Natural History Museum Lepidoptera generic names catalog

Cossinae
Moth genera